Dmitri Valentinovich Gulenkov (born 22 May 1968) is a Russian football coach and a former player.

Honours
Tavriya Simferopol
 Ukrainian Premier League champion: 1992

Navbahor Namangan
 Uzbek League bronze: 1995
 Uzbekistan Cup winner: 1995

References

External links
 
 

1968 births
Footballers from Moscow
Living people
Soviet footballers
FC FShM Torpedo Moscow players
Navbahor Namangan players
Russian footballers
SC Tavriya Simferopol players
Russian expatriate footballers
Expatriate footballers in Ukraine
Ukrainian Premier League players
Russian expatriate sportspeople in Ukraine
FC Okean Nakhodka players
Russian Premier League players
Expatriate footballers in Uzbekistan
Tianjin Jinmen Tiger F.C. players
Expatriate footballers in China
FC Tom Tomsk players
Russian football managers
Association football goalkeepers
FC Torpedo Moscow players